The British Youths Open Championship was a youths golf tournament that was played from 1954 to 1994. It was 72-hole stroke-play event for golfers under 22. From 1954 to 1962, it was organised by a committee led by Sam Bunton, a Glasgow architect, and was open to assistant professionals as well as amateurs, but from 1963, it was taken over by The R&A and became an amateur-only event, called: the British Youths Open Amateur Championship. The R&A dropped the event because they felt it was no longer needed to bridge the gap between boy's and men's golf. A 54-hole girls' event was also held. In 1963, the event was taken over by the Scottish Ladies' Golfing Association and called the Scottish Girls' Open Stroke-play Championship.

Winners

(p) = professional

In 1954 there was an under-18 section which was won by Ronnie Shade.

International matches
In 1955, an international match between England and Scotland was arranged the day before the start of the championship, although the match had a lower age limit than that used in the championship. Another match was arranged the following year, although the result was decided on holes rather than matches. There was no match in 1957 but it was arranged again in 1958 and 1959. From 1960, the event was contested for the Alex Mackay Memorial Trophy.

In 1967, a second match was arranged, between Great Britain & Ireland and the Continent of Europe, later called the EGA Trophy. This was played the day before the start of the championship with the England/Scotland match being played a day earlier. The same system was retained for a number of years while the EGA Trophy match was played before the championship. In 1976, and on a number of occasions from 1980, the EGA Trophy match was not played in connection with the championship, and on those occasions, the England/Scotland match was played the day before the championship rather than two days before.

British Girls' Stroke-play Championship
The girls section of the British Youths Open Championship was later called the British Girls' Stroke-play Championship. It was played over 54 holes. In 1963, the event was taken over by the Scottish Ladies' Golfing Association and called the Scottish Girls' Open Stroke-play Championship. The Scottish under-21 event was played from 1963 until 2015, when it was dropped from the schedule. The last winner was Cloe Frankish.

1955  Marjory Fowler
1956  Belle McCorkindale
1957  Marjory Fowler
1958  Ruth Porter
1959  Diane Robb
1960  Julia Greenhalgh
1961  Diane Robb
1962  Susan Armitage
1963  Ann Irvin

References

Golf tournaments in the United Kingdom
Recurring sporting events established in 1954
Recurring sporting events disestablished in 1994